Susan Walsh (March 30, 1948 – February 6, 2009) was an American actress. She worked primarily in the films of John Waters. Because of her work with Waters, she is considered one of the Dreamlanders, Waters' ensemble of regular cast and crew members.

Biography
Walsh is reported to have died of natural causes on February 6, 2009, at the age of 60.

Filmography

Mondo Trasho (1969) (uncredited) as Shocked Laundromat Patron
Multiple Maniacs (1970) as Female Church-Goer
Pink Flamingos (1972) as Suzie
Female Trouble (1974) as Chicklette
Divine Trash (1998) as herself

References

External links

1948 births
2009 deaths